Pharnabazus III (Old Iranian: Farnabāzu, Ancient Greek: Φαρνάβαζος; c. 370 BC - after 320 BC) was a Persian satrap who fought against Alexander the Great. His father was Artabazus II, and his mother a Greek from Rhodes.

Youth in Macedonia
Pharnabazus was the son of Artabazus, satrap of Hellespontine Phrygia. However, Artabazus was exiled after a failed rebellion against Artaxerxes III in 358 BC. From 352 to 342, the family went into exile to Macedonia, in the capital of Pella, under the rule of king Philip II (360-336), where they met the young Prince Alexander, future Alexander the Great. With Artabazus and Pharnabazus was Memnon of Rhodes, a Greek mercenary and relative by marriage. 

Artabazus, Pharnabazus and Memnon were later allowed to return to Persia, in 343 BC. Memnon obtained the command of the Persian navy in the Aegean sea in 334 BC, with Pharnabazus joining him.

War against Alexander

When Alexander invaded the Persian empire, Memnon defended the strategically important town of Halicarnassus, which Alexander was then diverted to capture, forcing him to seek reinforcements.  This allowed the Persians time to regroup, until Halicarnassus fell in the first months of 333 BC.

Memnon and Pharnabazus then directed their strategy to disrupt Alexander's supply lines by taking Aegean islands near the Hellespont and by fomenting rebellion in southern Greece. Memnon and Pharnabazus had a navy of about 300 warships, composed of Phoenician, Egyptian and Cypriot units, as well as thousands of Greek mercenaries and vast amounts of silver and gold.

Support of the Spartan king Agis III against Alexander
At around the same time, the Spartan king Agis III and the Athenian statesman Demosthenes organised forces to liberate their cities from the Macedonians. In the autumn of 333 BC, the Spartan King Agis III had met with the Persian commanders Pharnabazus and Autophradates, somewhere in the Aegean Sea, and revealed to them his plans for a war against Alexander—in Greece itself. The Persians agreed to support Agis; however, they could only spare him 30 talents and 10 ships. Agis also recruited the Greek mercenary survivors of Issus - who had served in the Persian army – a force of 8,000 veterans. 

Memnon and Pharnabazus took Cos and Chios, but during the siege of Mytilene, the capital of Lesbos, Memnon died of a fever. Pharnabazus took control of the Persian forces in the Aegean, assisted by Autophradates. They captured Mytilene and the isle of Tenedos, which gave him control over the Hellespont.

Pharnabazus further threatened Alexander's supplies by establishing a fortified position near Halicarnassus, which made the harbour inaccessible. He also took Samothrace, Siphnos and Andros and seized all Greek supply ships. 

However, after the Persian king Darius III lost the decisive Battle of Issus in November 333 BC, Pharnabazus became increasingly isolated. The Spartan king, Agis III, whilst still receiving ten ships and thirty talents of silver from the Achaemenids, withdrew from outright rebellion. Pharnabazus had to deal with rebellions in his conquered territory and many of his troops deserted him. His much reduced navy was defeated near Chios and Pharnabazus was captured. While being taken to Alexander, he managed to escape and went to Cos.

Later life

What happened after his escape is not known. There is a gap in the records. It is assumed that he eventually submitted to Alexander, since in 324 BC, Artonis, the sister of Pharnabazus, was given in marriage to Eumenes by Alexander the Great.

In 321 BC we find Pharnabazus commanding a squadron of cavalry for Eumenes, in the Battle of the Hellespont (321 BC) in which he defeated Craterus and Neoptolemus.

Notes

Opponents of Alexander the Great
Satraps of the Achaemenid Empire
4th-century BC rulers
Persian people of the Greco-Persian Wars
Pharnacid dynasty
4th-century BC Iranian people